The 2010–11 Connecticut Huskies men's basketball team represented the University of Connecticut in the 2010–2011 NCAA Division I basketball season. The Huskies were coached by Jim Calhoun and played their home games at the XL Center in Hartford, Connecticut, and on campus at the Harry A. Gampel Pavilion in Storrs, Connecticut. The Huskies were a member of the Big East Conference. 

The Huskies entered the year unranked and picked to finish tenth in the Big East.  In November, they won the Maui Invitational Tournament for the second time.  They finished the Big East regular season in a tie for ninth place at 9–9.  Led by Kemba Walker who scored a tournament record 130 points, they became the first school to win five conference tournament games in as many days in claiming their seventh Big East tournament title.  By winning the tournament, they were awarded an automatic berth into the 2011 NCAA Division I men's basketball tournament.  They advanced to their fourth Final Four with a 65–63 victory over Arizona and advanced to their third National Championship game with a 56–55 victory over Kentucky and beat Butler 53–41 for their first championship since 2004 and third since 1999.

Before the season
The Huskies were coming off of a tumultuous 2009–10 season in which they failed to earn a berth in the NCAA tournament for the second time in four years, and amidst an NCAA investigation into alleged recruiting violations involving Nate Miles.  As a result of the investigation, assistant coaches Patrick Sellers and Beau Archibald resigned from their positions.  Later that summer, Kevin Ollie was hired to take Sellers' role as assistant coach, and Glen Miller was brought on as Director of Basketball Operations, replacing Archibald.  Both men have previous links with Jim Calhoun.  Ollie played for the Huskies under Calhoun from 1991–95, while Miller was an assistant coach under Calhoun from 1986 until 1992.
In addition to the coaching changes, the Huskies also needed to replace three graduating starters: Jerome Dyson, Stanley Robinson and Gavin Edwards.  Reserve forward Ater Majok also left the school before the season began.
Prior to the start of the season, the Huskies were picked by both the Big East coaches and writers to finish tenth in the conference.  The team was not ranked in the top 25 in any major national poll, although they did receive votes in the Preseason AP Poll.
With regards to individual honors, Kemba Walker was selected to the Preseason All Big East first team, and was named to both the Wooden and Naismith award preseason watchlists.

Recruiting class

Roster

Regular season 
After a pair of exhibition games, the Huskies began the regular season with non-conference wins over America East teams, Stony Brook and Vermont.  In the win against Vermont, Kemba Walker tied a UConn XL Center record by scoring 42 points.
The team next travelled to Hawaii to play in the 2010 Maui Invitational Tournament.  They last participated in the tournament in 2005, when they won the championship.  To open the current tournament, they played Wichita State.  Walker scored 29 of his 31 points in the second in the 83–79 win.   The victory meant they would match up with Michigan State, who was ranked No. 2 in the AP poll at the time.  Walker scored 30 points, the third straight game that he eclipsed the 30 point mark, as the Huskies won 70–67.  In the championship game, the Huskies outscored Kentucky 21–2 at the end of the first half, and defeated the Wildcats, 84–67.  Walker, who scored 29 points in the final, was named the tournament's Most Valuable Player.  His 90 points was just three points short of the Maui Invitational record.  Alex Oriakhi was also named to the all-tournament team.

Postseason 
The Huskies entered the Big East tournament as the No. 9 seed, just missing the cut to earn a First round bye.  UConn went on to win five games in five consecutive days to earn the Tournament Championship, and an automatic bid into the NCAA tournament.  In the Big East tournament, UConn defeated four teams ranked in the Associated Press Top 25.

UConn received a No. 3 seed in the NCAA Tournament's West Region.  They continued their winning streak all the way to the National Championship, finishing the season with eleven consecutive wins. As a result of having to play 5 games to win their conference tournament, they became the first team in Division I history to play 41 games in a season.

Schedule 

|-
!colspan=8 style=| Exhibition

|-
!colspan=8 style=| Regular Season

 

 

|-
!colspan=9 style=| 2011 Big East tournament

|-
!colspan=10 style=| 2011 NCAA Tournament

Players drafted into the NBA

Notes

External links

UConn Huskies men's basketball seasons
Connecticut Huskies
Connecticut
NCAA Division I men's basketball tournament Final Four seasons
NCAA Division I men's basketball tournament championship seasons
2010 in sports in Connecticut
2011 in sports in Connecticut